The Mowich Group is a geologic group in Oregon. It preserves fossils dating back to the Jurassic period.

See also

 List of fossiliferous stratigraphic units in Oregon
 Paleontology in Oregon

References
 

Jurassic System of North America
Geologic groups of Oregon